Charles Hinshaw Jr., also known as "Prince Charlez", is an American singer and songwriter, best known for co-writing Rihanna's "Needed Me", Usher"s "More", and Beyoncé's "Ring Off".

Discography
Projects 
 Black and Gold EP (2016)
 Evolution Pt 1 EP (2017)

Songwriting and production credits

Credits are courtesy of Discogs, Tidal, and AllMusic.

Guest appearances

Awards and nominations

References 

21st-century American singers
21st-century American male singers
African-American songwriters
American male singer-songwriters
American rhythm and blues singer-songwriters
Living people
Year of birth missing (living people)